KBHL (103.9 FM, "PraiseLive") is a Contemporary Christian Music radio station in Osakis, Minnesota, United States, owned by Christian Heritage Broadcasting.

Satellite and translator stations
PraiseLive is rebroadcast on the following stations:

PraiseLive is also heard on these translators:

Africa
PraiseLive is partnered with Spirit FM, a network of five stations in Africa: three in Ghana, and two in Uganda. The Uganda stations also reach into the war-torn nation of Sudan to the north. There is another station in the process of being built in Sudan. PraiseLive contributes programming specially produced for broadcast on Spirit FM.

History

Twin Cities Signal
In 2008, PraiseFM began broadcasting its station on 95.3 MHz KNOF in the Twin Cities forming a partnership with North Central University.  The studio is located North Central University campus in downtown Minneapolis in the former Comm Arts building .

Selby Gospel Broadcasting Corporation eventually sold KNOF to Praise Broadcasting by June 2014.

In 2015, Praise FM was approached by Northern Lights Broadcasting with a proposal to purchase of KNOF.  This purchase would allow PraiseFM transfer their signal from 95.3FM to KTWN's 96.3 HD2,  increase their signal to a greater portion of the Twin Cities area. On January 4, 2016, PraiseFM transferred their signal from KNOF 95.3 to KTWN 96.3 HD2. The sale to the Pohlad family (who also own the Minnesota Twins) netted PraiseFM nearly $8 million.

In 2019, KBHL rebranded as "PraiseLive" with no change in format.  After the Pohlads sold their stations to the Educational Media Foundation in 2021, "PraiseLive" moved from KQGO 96.3 HD2 back to KNOF.

References

External links
"PraiseLive"
Listen Online'

Christian radio stations in Minnesota
Contemporary Christian radio stations in the United States
Radio stations established in 1960
1960 establishments in Minnesota
North Central University